The Bolivian Civic Action (Spanish: Acción Cívica Boliviana, ACB) was a small conservative political party in Bolivia.

The Bolivian Civic Action was founded in 1951
under the patronage of Carlos Víctor Aramayo, proprietor of a powerful mining company and of the newspaper La Razón.

In the 1951 elections the ACB's presidential candidate was Guillermo Gutiérrez Vea Murguía; he polled 6,654 votes (05.28%) in the election.

In the 1964 elections the ACB's polled barely 7 votes.

In the 1970s the Bolivian Civic Action went out of existence.

Notes

Conservative parties in Bolivia
Defunct political parties in Bolivia
Political parties established in 1951
1951 establishments in Bolivia
Political parties disestablished in the 1970s
1970s disestablishments in Bolivia